Marika No. 5 is the fifth solo album by Marika Gombitová released on OPUS in 1984.

Track listing

Official releases
 1984: №5, LP, OPUS, #9113 1562 (repress in 1985)
 1984: № 5, MC, OPUS, #9913 0218
 1996: №5, CD, OPUS, #9353 1562 
 1996: №5, CD, Open Music, #0051 2311 (re-release)
 2004: No. 5, 3 bonus tracks, CD, OPUS, #91 1562 (Komplet 5 series)
 2007: №5, CD, SME, #91 0014-2 (Slovenské legendárne albumy series)
 2007: №5, Download, OPUS, #8584019156221

Personnel

 Marika Gombitová – lead vocal, writer
 Peter Breiner – producer, piano, Fender Rhodes, SCI Pro-One, Roland Juno 60, Roland Vocoder, Yamaha DX7, strings conductor, arranger
 Ladislav Lučenič – bass electric guitar, Juno 60, ARP Oddysey, arranger
 Kamil Peteraj – lyrics
 Juraj Lehotský – trumpets
 Ľudovít Horský – trumpets
 Pavel Zajaček – trombone
 Tibor Mrázik – trombone

 Ľuboš Stankovský – Simmons drums
 Viliam Vaškovič programmer Roland Drums Computer TR 808,
 Ivan Minárik – keyboards, programmer ARP Oddysey, SCI Pro-One, Roland Juno 60, Roland Vocoder, sound director, technical collaboration,
 Štefan Danko – responsible editor
 Juraj Filo – sound director
 Zuzana Mináčová – photography
 Ján Lehotský – writer (bonus tracks 11–12)

Charts

Year-end charts

Export release

The export version of the album, entitled №5, was issued in 1985.

Track listing

Official releases
 1985: №5, LP, MC, OPUS, #9113 1624

Additional personnel
 Katarína Karovičová-Rybková – English transcription 
 Miroslav Brocko – design

References

General

Specific

External links 
 

1984 albums
Marika Gombitová albums
Pop albums by Slovak artists